The 1942 United States Senate election in Virginia was held on November 3, 1942. Incumbent Democratic Senator Carter Glass defeated Socialist Lawrence S. Wilkes and was elected to his fifth term in office.

Results

References

External links

Virginia
1942
1942 Virginia elections